Josée is a 2020 South Korean romantic drama film based on a Japanese short story Josee, the Tiger and the Fish written by Seiko Tanabe. It was directed and written by Kim Jong-kwan. It stars actress Han Ji-min as Josée and actor Nam Joo-hyuk as Lee Young-seok. The film was released in South Korea on December 10, 2020.

Plot
Josée (Han Ji-min) lives in a house where she and her grandmother live alone, reading and imagining her own world. Young-seok (Nam Joo-hyuk), who starts to feel special feelings for the woman he met by chance, begins to approach her slowly and sincerely. 

The two begin a relationship and experience first love and heartbreak in all its pains and joys.

Cast
 Han Ji-min as Josée
 Nam Joo-hyuk as Lee Young-seok
 Heo Jin as Mr. Dabok
 Park Ye-jin as Hye-seon
 Shim Wan-joon as Hye-seon's boyfriend
 Jung Yi-seo as Na-young
 Jo Bok-rae as Cheol-ho
 Lee So-hee as Soo-kyung
 Lee Sung-wook as Choi-kyung

References

External links
 
 
 

2020 films
2020 romantic drama films
Films about cancer
Films about disability
Films about paraplegics or quadriplegics
Films based on Japanese novels
Films based on short fiction
Films directed by Kim Jong-kwan
Films set in the 2000s
Films set in 2005
Films set in 2006
Films set in South Korea
2020s Korean-language films
South Korean remakes of Japanese films
South Korean drama films
South Korean romantic drama films
Warner Bros. films